Argopsin, also known as 1-chloropannarin, is a secondary metabolite produced by many lichen species, such as Biatora cuprea and Micarea lignaria. Argopsin was first isolated from the lichen Argopsis friesiana. The chemical composition of argopsin is 2,7-Dichloro-3-hydroxy-8-methoxy-1,6,9-trimethyl-11-oxo-11H-dibenzo[b,e][1,4]dioxepin-4-carbaldehyde.

Uses 
Argopsin can have photohemolytic effect when activated under ultraviolet light with a wavelength of 366 nm.

Argopsin has been shown to have in vitro effect on Leishmania at a concentration of 50 µg/ml.

References 

Secondary metabolites
Lichen products
Chloroarenes
Heterocyclic compounds with 3 rings
Lactones
Cyclic ethers
Methoxy compounds